RG7795 (previously ANA773) is an antiviral drug candidate that as of 2015 had been in Phase II trials in hepatitis B.  It is an orally-available prodrug of isatoribine, that was under development by Anadys Pharmaceuticals when it was acquired by Roche in 2011.  Its active metabolite is an agonist of TLR7; activation of TLR7 causes secretion of endogenous type 1 interferons, which have antiviral activity.

As of 2021, development of RG7795 appears to be discontinued.

References 

Antiviral drugs
Hepatitis B
Abandoned drugs